Endre Sík (2 April 1891 – 10 April 1978) was a Hungarian historian, politician, Minister of Foreign Affairs between 1958 and 1961. He was the younger brother of the priest Sándor Sík who was also a poet and piarist teacher.

During the First World War he was captured by the Russians. After that he lived in the Soviet Union. In 1920, he joined the Soviet Communist Party. In 1945, he returned to Hungary, and became a communist politician. He was deputy of the Minister of Foreign Affairs(1954–1958), then minister (1958–1961).

In his scientific work, he studied the history of African ethnic groups. He obtained the Doctor of Sciences degree of the Hungarian Academy of Sciences in 1962.

His book, Vihar a levelet, containing his recollections on the Soviet Union in the 1930s, was banned and withdrawn immediately after appearance.

Works
 Fekete Afrika története I–IV (The history of Black Africa), Akadémiai Kiadó, Budapest, 1961–1973.
 in English: Vol. I, Vol. II, Vol. III, Vol. IV
 Vihar a levelet, Zrínyi Könyvkiadó, Budapest, 1970.

References

 Magyar Életrajzi Lexikon

1891 births
1978 deaths
Writers from Budapest
Hungarian prisoners of war
Austro-Hungarian prisoners of war in World War I
World War I prisoners of war held by Russia
Institute of Red Professors alumni
Historians of Africa
Hungarian communists
Foreign ministers of Hungary
Hungarian expatriates in the Soviet Union
Communist Party of the Soviet Union members
Hungarian Africanists
Recipients of the Order of Friendship of Peoples
Lenin Peace Prize recipients
Burials at Kerepesi Cemetery